Makshoof Music is a Middle East-based online platform dedicated to undiscovered musical talent. The platform launched in July 2010 as a part of the Middle East-based website triplew.me

First winner

The winning profile from Makshoof Music's first iteration belonged to Egyptian singer/songwriter Shady Ahmed. The decision came after an extensive voting process which took into consideration public votes as well as a jury decision. The jury included Adam Grundey from Rolling Stone Middle East in addition to other music industry professionals.
In January 2011, Shady Ahmed was awarded recording time at a Dubai-based studio as well as a host of other opportunities, such as a performance on Dubai One TV and a segment on City 7 TV.

The re-launch of Makshoof Music

Makshoof Music partnered with EMI Arabia to offer Middle Eastern talent the chance to be on the second volume of the Rock the Kasbah compilation.

References

External links
Makshoof Music

Talent agencies